Tanjung Malim–Slim River Highway, Federal Route 1, is a major highway in Perak and Selangor state, Malaysia. This was the first tolled highway in Malaysia.

History
The road was upgraded into tolled highway in 1966 and it was opened to traffic on same year. Toll collection began on 6 am on 16 March 1966. Cars were tolled 50 cents, buses and lorries RM1 and motorcycles 20 cents. In 1994, with the completion of the North–South Expressway, the toll plaza is removed and it became a toll-free highway.

List of interchanges

References

See also
 Federal route 1

Highways in Malaysia